Elisabet Sadó Garriga, (born September 22, 1981 in Barcelona, Spain) is a professional squash player who represented Spain. She won the British Junior Open Squash Under-19 category in 1999. She reached a career-high world ranking of World No. 196 in November 2007.

References

External links 

Sportspeople from Barcelona
Spanish female squash players
Living people
1981 births
Sportswomen from Catalonia
21st-century Spanish women